Oh Seong-Ok (born October 10, 1972) is a South Korean handball player who is the first Korean woman to compete at five Olympics (1992 to 2008).

In 1992, she was part of the South Korean team, which won the gold medal. She played all five matches and scored twenty goals.

Four years later she won the silver medal as member of the South Korean team. She played all five matches and scored 24 goals.

In 2000, she was part of the South Korean team which finished fourth in the Olympic tournament. She played all seven matches and scored 35 goals.

In 2004, she won the silver medal with the South Korean team again. She played all seven matches and scored 24 goals.

She is the third South Korean to compete at five Olympics, after shooter Lee Eun-chul and alpine skier Hur Seung-Wook.

See also
List of athletes with the most appearances at Olympic Games

External links
Database Olympics Profile
Sports Reference Profile

1972 births
Living people
South Korean female handball players
Olympic handball players of South Korea
Handball players at the 1992 Summer Olympics
Handball players at the 1996 Summer Olympics
Handball players at the 2000 Summer Olympics
Handball players at the 2004 Summer Olympics
Handball players at the 2008 Summer Olympics
Olympic gold medalists for South Korea
Olympic silver medalists for South Korea
Olympic bronze medalists for South Korea
Olympic medalists in handball
Medalists at the 2008 Summer Olympics
Medalists at the 2004 Summer Olympics
Asian Games medalists in handball
Handball players at the 1990 Asian Games
Handball players at the 1994 Asian Games
Medalists at the 1996 Summer Olympics
Medalists at the 1992 Summer Olympics
Asian Games gold medalists for South Korea
Medalists at the 1990 Asian Games
Medalists at the 1994 Asian Games
20th-century South Korean women
21st-century South Korean women